Kalbi may refer to:

 Galbi, a Korean dish
 Kalbiyya, a Syrian Alawite tribe
 An Indian caste, see Anjana Chaudhari